Robert A. Stein (born 1939) is the Everett Fraser Professor of Law at the University of Minnesota and a past head of the American Bar Association.  A noted scholar of estate planning, Stein was previously the William Pattee Professor and Dean at the University of Minnesota Law School, from which he received his law degree in 1961.  He also taught law at UCLA and the University of Chicago.

Career outside academia

Stein is a trustee of Great Northern Iron Ore, and is of counsel with the law firm of Gray Plant Mooty.   From 1994 to 2006, he served as executive director and chief operating officer of the American Bar Association, the world's largest professional organization.   The membership of the ABA has grown to over 400,000. Stein serves as President of the National Conference of Commissioners on Uniform State Laws from 2009-2011.

Awards

Stein's professional awards include:

Outstanding Service to the Profession Award, Minnesota Lawyer, 2009
University of Minnesota Alumni Service Award, 2007
Lena O. Smith Humanitarian Award, Minnesota Black Women Lawyers Network, 2002
Minnesota State Bar Association, Presidents Award, 1998
Distinguished Service Award, WCHA, 1995
Honorary doctorate from the Faculty of Law at Uppsala University, Sweden, 1994

Personal life

Stein currently resides in Minnesota.He has three daughters and six grandchildren.

Sources

1939 births
American legal scholars
Deans of law schools in the United States
American Bar Association
University of Minnesota Law School faculty
Minnesota lawyers
Living people
University of Minnesota Law School alumni
University of Minnesota alumni
American chief operating officers